Nancy Lagomarsino is an American poet. She is the author of three books of prose poems, the most recent being Light from an Eclipse (White Pine Press), a memoir covering the years of her father's experience with Alzheimer's disease. In describing his reaction to the book, Wally Lamb wrote that "Light from an Eclipse is, in equal measures, heartrending and celebratory of the beauty and buoyancy of life in the face of death." Lagomarsino has published poems in numerous magazines and journals, including Cimarron Review, Quarterly West, The Prose Poem  and Ploughshares.

Life 
Born in Montpelier, Vermont, Lagomarsino currently lives in Hanover, New Hampshire, where she and her husband David raised two sons, and have lived since 1974. She received her  B.A. in English from Northeastern University and her M.F.A. in creative writing from Vermont College.

Published works
 Light From An Eclipse (White Pine Press, 2005)
 The Secretary Parables (Alice James Books, 1991)
 The Sleep Handbook (Alice James Books, 1987)

References

Sources
  New Hampshire Arts – New Hampshire Poet Showcase > Nancy Lagomarsino
 Alice James Books Website > Various Pages

External links
 White Pine Press Website
 Poem: Academy of American Poets > Untitled > by Nancy Lagomarsino
 Poem: Key Satch(el) > Index of Work 1997 > January 1997 - Vol. 1, No. 1
 Review: Literature, Arts & Medicine Database > Light From an Eclipse by Nancy Lagomarsino
 Review: Kingdom Books Blog > June 22, 2007 > Reviews by Beth Kanell of Sleep Handbook and The Secretary Parables by Nancy Lagomarsino

Poets from New Hampshire
Living people
Northeastern University alumni
People from Montpelier, Vermont
Vermont College of Fine Arts alumni
People from Hanover, New Hampshire
American women poets
Year of birth missing (living people)
21st-century American women